Mayfair is a historic home located near Jenkinsville, Fairfield County, South Carolina.  It was built about 1824, and is a two-story, weatherboarded Federal style frame residence with a hipped roof. The front façade features a central, two-story, polygonal pedimented portico. According to local tradition, Mayfair was the home of Burrell B. Cook, a moderately wealthy planter, who served in the Twenty-eighth General Assembly of South Carolina from 1828 to 1829.

It was added to the National Register of Historic Places in 1985.

References

Houses on the National Register of Historic Places in South Carolina
Federal architecture in South Carolina
Houses completed in 1824
Houses in Fairfield County, South Carolina
National Register of Historic Places in Fairfield County, South Carolina